Lakhnaur is a village located near Jhanjharpur (a subdivision in the Madhubani district). It is located 15 km from the Koshi River, in the state of Bihar, India. The local language is Maithili. 

The land is fertile, supporting the growth of mango, orchids, rice, wheats, and makhana. There are also fish ponds. Nearby is the Badka Mahadev Lord Shiva temple, known for its mythological stories.

Lakhnaur has its own website, which is moderated by some villagers. In this block a popular village umari where 5 pound available and a great exporter of fish and Laufa haat is very famous where people purchase cow and buffalo.

Educational Institutions 
 Middle school, Lakhnaur
 Girls' school, Lakhnaur
 Dharawati high school, Lakhnaur 
 Girls' high school, Lakhnaur
 Sanskrit school, Lakhnaur
 Kasturba Gandhi Balika Vidyalaya, Lakhnaur

Places to visit 
 Radha Krishna Mandir, Lakhnaur
 Baba Lakshminath Gosai Kuti, Lakhnaur
 Sita Ram Mandir, Lakhnaur
 Baba Somnath Mahadev Mandir, Lakhnaur
 Baba Bhuteshwar Nath Mandir, Lakhnaur
 Baba Dihvar Sthan, Lakhnaur
 Maa Durga Sthan, Lakhnaur

Popular crossroads 
 Dihvar chowk, Lakhnaur
 Ram chowk, Lakhnaur
 Bans chowk, Lakhnaur
 Mahakal chowk, Lakhnaur
 Durgasthan chowk, Lakhnaur

Popular ponds 
 Pakka Pokhair, Lakhnaur
 Bhavansar, Lakhnaur
 Baidaka Pokhair, Lakhnaur
 Navi Pokhair, Lakhnaur
 Bhutta Pokhair, Lakhnaur

References

External links
 http://www.lakhnaur.in/
 https://villageinfo.in/bihar/madhubani/lakhnaur/lakhnaur.html
 https://www.facebook.com/lakhnaur.in/

Villages in Madhubani district